A referendum on the New Union Treaty was held in  Abkhazia on 17 March 1991, as part of the wider Soviet referendum. The treaty was approved by 99.06% of voters.

Background
The treaty would have reorganised the Soviet Union  into a less centralised state. However, it was largely boycotted by the Georgian population in Abkhazia, whilst in Georgia no referendum was held.

Results

Aftermath
The Union Treaty was approved in the republics where referendums were held, but its coming into effect was prevented by the August 1991 coup attempt and the subsequent dissolution of the Soviet Union on 26 December.

The fact that voters in Abkhazia approved the new union treaty while the Georgian SSR declared its independence on 9 April has been used by Abkhazia as an argument that Georgia became de jure independent from the Soviet Union without Abkhazia, which was then free to choose its own future.

References

1991 referendums
1991
Abkhaz–Georgian conflict
1991 in Abkhazia
1991 in international relations
Referendums in the Soviet Union
March 1991 events in Asia